Krasny Dvor is a rural locality (a village) in Nikolo-Ramenskoye Rural Settlement, Cherepovetsky District, Vologda Oblast, Russia. The population was six, as of 2002. There are two streets.

Geography 
Nikolo-Ramenye is the nearest rural locality.

References 

Rural localities in Cherepovetsky District